The Brigantine, Caravel, Corvette and Shamrock fields are natural gas reservoirs and gas production facilities in the southern North Sea, close to the UK/Netherlands median line. The fields have produced natural gas since 1999.

The fields 
The Brigantine, Caravel, Corvette and Shamrock gas fields are located in the adjacent UK Offshore Blocks 49/19, 49/20 and 49/24. Brigantine, Caravel and Corvette follow Shell’s convention of naming southern North Sea fields after types of sailing vessels. Brigantine has four gas accumulations designated A-D. The gas reservoirs have the following characteristics.

Development 
The gas producing capability of the fields was realised through five offshore platforms, their characteristics are summarised in the table.   ##2 1 3 7

Production 
Gas production from the fields is summarised in the table. Gas from these installations flows to the Leman A complex and from there to the Bacton gas terminal.

The production profile, in mcm/y, of the Corvette field was as shown.

See also 

 Leman gas field
 Bacton gas terminal 
 List of oil and gas fields of the North Sea

References 

Natural gas fields in the United Kingdom
North Sea energy